Julius Herska or Julius Herzka (1859–1925) was an Austrian stage actor and director. He also directed eight films during the silent era including the Victor Hugo adaptation The Grinning Face.

Selected filmography
 The Grinning Face (1921)
 Meriota the Dancer (1922)
 The Separating Bridge (1922)
 The Little Sin (1923)

References

Bibliography
 John T. Soister & Henry Nicolella. Down from the Attic: Rare Thrillers of the Silent Era through the 1950s. McFarland, 2016.

External links

1859 births
1925 deaths
Austrian male stage actors
Austrian film directors
Theatre people from Budapest
Male actors from Budapest
Film people from Budapest